Moira Johanna von Wright (born 23 December 1957 in Helsinki) is a Finnish and Swedish academic, who has been the rector of first Södertörn University 2010-2016 and Åbo Akademi University between August 2019 and October 2021. She grew up in Turku, Finland.

Career 
Professor of Pedagogy (from 2007) and Pro-Rector (from 2008) of Örebro University. She has been a Visiting Professor at the University of Oslo for two years and a visiting fellow at Cambridge University

In 2010-2016, she was rector of Södertörn University College. Her tenure  proved controversial and she was openly criticised for an authoritarian leadership style.

Von Wright was appointed rector at Åbo Akademi University in 2019. At its meeting in Vaasa on 1 November 2021, the Board of Åbo Akademi University decided to dismiss Rector Moira von Wright, citing a crisis of confidence between the rector and the rest of the university due to a perceived lack of transparency and insufficient communication, as well as differing views regarding the leadership and future development of Åbo Akademi.

She belongs to the noble von Wright family.

References

1957 births
Living people
Swedish-speaking Finns
Swedish people of Scottish descent
University of Helsinki alumni
Stockholm University alumni
Academic staff of Örebro University
Academic staff of Södertörn University
Swedish women academics
Finnish women academics
20th-century Finnish nobility
21st-century Finnish nobility